The 12355 / 56 Patna Junction–Jammu Tawi Archana Express is a Superfast Express train belonging to Indian Railways – East Central Railway zone that runs between  and  in India.

It operates as train number 12355 from Patna Junction to Jammu Tawi and as train number 12356 in the reverse direction, serving the states of Bihar, Uttar Pradesh, Haryana, Punjab and Jammu and Kashmir.

Coaches

The 12355 / 56 Patna Junction–Jammu Tawi Archana Express has 2 AC 2 tier, 4 AC 3 tier, 11 Sleeper class, 2 General Unreserved & 2 Generator cum Luggage Rack Coaches. In addition, it carries a pantry car .
Train uses LHB coach.
As is customary with most train services in India, coach composition may be amended at the discretion of Indian Railways depending on demand.

Service

As the average speed of the train is above , as per Indian Railways rules, its fare includes a Superfast surcharge.

Routeing

The 12355 / 56 Patna Junction–Jammu Tawi Archana Express runs from Patna Junction, Bhadohi, Rae Bareli Junction, Lucknow NR, Ambala Cantt Junction, Jalandhar cantt Junction to Jammu Tawi .

Traction

As route is now fully electrified, a Mughalsarai-based WAP-7 locomotive  hauls the train for its entire journey.

Operation

12355 Patna Junction–Jammu Tawi Archana Express runs from Patna Junction every Tuesday and Saturday, reaching Jammu Tawi the next day.

12356 Jammu Tawi–Patna Junction Archana Express runs from Jammu Tawi every Wednesday and Sunday, reaching 
Patna Junction the next day.

References 

 http://www.holidayiq.com/railways/archana-express-12355-train.html
 https://www.youtube.com/watch?v=d2oyK02AI3o
 https://www.flickr.com/photos/48244096@N03/9526277313/

External links

Express trains in India
Rail transport in Bihar
Rail transport in Uttar Pradesh
Rail transport in Haryana
Rail transport in Punjab, India
Rail transport in Jammu and Kashmir
Transport in Jammu
Transport in Patna
Railway services introduced in 2003
Named passenger trains of India